Madame Web (Cassandra Webb) is a fictional character appearing in American comic books published by Marvel Comics. She first appeared in The Amazing Spider-Man #210, published November 1980, and was created by writer Denny O'Neil and artist John Romita Jr. She is usually depicted as a supporting character in the Spider-Man comic book series, where she appears as an elderly woman with myasthenia gravis, connected to a life support system resembling a spiderweb.

Madame Web was a clairvoyant, and precognitive mutant who first showed up to help Spider-Man find a kidnap victim. She was not one of the mutants that lost their power during the Decimation storyline. She was attacked by Sarah and Ana Kravinoff, who killed her, but not before she was able to pass her powers of precognition as well as her blindness on to Julia Carpenter, who became the next Madame Web. Webb is the grandmother of the fourth Spider-Woman, Charlotte Witter.

Dakota Johnson will play Madame Web in an upcoming solo film set in Sony's Spider-Man Universe.

Publication history

Madame Web was created by writer Dennis O'Neil and artist John Romita Jr., and first appeared in The Amazing Spider-Man #210 (November 1980).

Fictional character biography

Cassandra Webb
Cassandra Webb was born in Salem, Oregon. She is a paralyzed, blind, telepathic, clairvoyant, and precognitive mutant, allowing her to work as a professional medium. She was originally stricken with myasthenia gravis and was connected to a life support system designed by her husband Jonathan Webb, which included a series of tubes shaped like a spider-web.

When Spider-Man approached her to help find kidnapped Daily Globe publisher K.J. Clayton (actually an impersonator), Madame Web used her powers to help him locate and rescue both the real and the fake Clayton, but disclosed to him that she had divined his secret identity.

In the "Nothing Can Stop the Juggernaut!" story arc, she contacts Spider-Man for assistance when Black Tom Cassidy dispatches the Juggernaut to capture her in the hope that her psychic powers would help them defeat the X-Men, only for her to nearly die after Juggernaut separated her from her life-support system. This triggered a vicious fight between Spider-Man and the Juggernaut, who was subsequently trapped in a construction site's wet cement foundation.

From the shock to her system, however, Madame Web apparently lost her memory of Spider-Man's secret identity.

Webb is the grandmother of the fourth Spider-Woman, Charlotte Witter. She participates in an arcane ritual known as the "Gathering of the Five", gaining immortality; she is restored to youth and her myasthenia gravis is cured. Webb serves as a mentor of sorts to the third Spider-Woman, the young Mattie Franklin.

Madame Web resurfaced, with her psychic powers intact, after Decimation.However, since House of M (in which she did appear young) she seems to have regained her aged appearance, though the myasthenia gravis remains gone.

Madame Web again returns in a back-up feature in The Amazing Spider-Man #600. She looks into the future, showing what are apparently quick looks into Spider-Man's future, only to see someone "unravelling the web of fate", and fearfully exclaiming "They're hunting spiders." After that, she is attacked by Ana Kravinoff and her mother Sasha. The pair incapacitate her and then claim "we now have our eyes". She is seen still held captive by Ana and her mother, as they inspect their new quarry, Mattie Franklin. While still bound in a chair, she apologizes to a then-unconscious Mattie, who is later killed by Sasha Kravinoff as part of a sacrificial ritual that revived Grim Hunter.

At the conclusion of "Grim Hunt", Madame Web has her throat slashed by Sasha Kravinoff in retaliation, as Sasha believed that Madame Web was deceiving her and knew the outcome of the events that transpired. Before dying, she reveals she is no longer blind, and passes her psychic powers over to Julia Carpenter.

During the Dead No More: The Clone Conspiracy storyline, Madame Web was cloned by the Jackal. She tipped off Prowler about a bank robbery vision she had which he managed to stop the bank robbery. When Prowler goes to get more information on the hacker from Madame Web, she tells him that she sees buildings filled with agony that cannot escape. When the villains at New U Technologies are getting out of control, Jackal sends Electro to find Prowler to put them under check again. Electro goes to Madame Web's room and tortures the telepath into giving her Prowler's location with the intent to kill him. Julia Carpenter senses that Madame Web is alive from telepathic feedback resulting from Electro's attack. Julia infiltrates New U Technologies and uses the opportunity to investigate the near-abandoned facility. During this time, Julia is led to Madame Web who refuses to take her medication to aid her in healing from Electro's attack. Madame Web has seen the future and refuses to be a part of it. Before dying from clone degeneration, Madame Web tells Julia to save Prowler.

Julia Carpenter

Characteristics

Powers and abilities 
Madame Web is a mutant who possesses several psychic abilities. She can use telepathy to read the minds of others. She has the ability to see the future. Madame Web can project an astral form of herself away from her physical body. She can perform psychic surgery on the minds of others. She is sensitive to psychic energies, allowing her to sense the presence of psionic powers in others, to see the area surrounding her, and events which take place far away from her. Additionally, Madame Web has a gifted intellect.

Condition 
When dying, she displayed the ability to transfer her mutation to another individual, such as Julia Carpenter. Madame Web was a victim of myasthenia gravis, a disorder of neuromuscular junction transmission. As a result, she was an invalid, entirely dependent on external, life support for survival. This is no longer the case as she was cured of the condition some time ago. She is also blind and relies on her powers to compensate. Madame Web is cybernetically linked to a spider-web-like life-support chair which attends to all of her bodily needs.

Reception

Accolades 

 In 2017, Screen Rant ranked Madame Web 12th in their "Every Member Of The Spider-Man Family" list.

Other versions
 A version of Madame Web makes a brief appearance in the heroic fantasy world of Avataars: Covenant of the Shield as "the Widow of the Web", a spider-goddess who grants Webswinger (the Spider-Man parallel) his powers.
 Webb also appeared during the "House of M" storyline as a therapist employed by S.H.I.E.L.D.
 Madame Web has died in the MC2 universe, but her reputation has inspired an entire temple of prophetic acolytes.
 Madame Web appeared in Ultimate Spider-Man.  In issue #102, she is part of the psych team that plans to change Ultimate Spider-Woman's memories. She appears in a wheelchair (implying paralysis) and blind, similar to the classic version. However, she is younger than that version of the character.

In other media

Television
 
 Madame Web appears in Spider-Man, voiced by Joan Lee. This version is an ally of the Beyonder with similar powers over reality tasked with testing Spider-Men from across the multiverse to determine whether they can stop Spider-Carnage from destroying the multiverse. After the "prime" Spider-Man succeeds in the mission, Madame Web takes him to find his lost girlfriend Mary Jane Watson as a reward.
 The Julia Carpenter incarnation of Madame Web appears in Ultimate Spider-Man, voiced by Cree Summer.

Film

In September 2019, Sony announced that a Madame Web solo film is in development with Burk Sharpless and Matt Sazama writing the film, which will be part of the Sony's Spider-Man Universe. In February 2022, it was reported that Dakota Johnson will play the lead character, with Sydney Sweeney set to co-star. Celeste O'Connor, Isabela Merced, and Tahar Rahim were added to the cast in May, Emma Roberts was added in June. Mike Epps was added in July. In April 2022, the film's release date was announced to be July 7, 2023 before being delayed to February 16, 2024.

Video games
 Madame Web appears in Questprobe featuring Spider-Man.
 Madame Web appears in Spider-Man: Shattered Dimensions, voiced by Susanne Blakeslee. After Spider-Man breaks the Tablet of Order and Chaos, she informs him of its mystical properties and tasks him, Spider-Man Noir, Spider-Man 2099, and a black-suited version of the Ultimate Spider-Man to retrieve its pieces in their respective universes before supervillains find them. She also provides instructions to the Spider-Men about their powers and grants them new ones so they can complete their mission more easily. However, Mysterio takes her hostage after discovering a fragment he stole granted him magical powers and demands the Spider-Men give him the rest. With the tablet reassembled, Mysterio becomes a god-like being and attempts to alter reality to his liking, but Madame Web is able to bring the four Spider-Men together so they can defeat Mysterio and separate him from the Tablet. Once they succeed, she sends everyone back to their respective home universe.

Notes

References

External links

Madame Web's Profile at Spiderfan.org
Madame Web's Profile at the Women of Marvel Comics
 

Characters created by Dennis O'Neil
Characters created by John Romita Jr.
Comics characters introduced in 1980
Fictional blind characters
Fictional characters from New York City
Fictional characters from Oregon
Fictional characters with precognition
Fictional spiritual mediums
Marvel Comics characters who have mental powers
Marvel Comics female characters
Marvel Comics mutants
Marvel Comics telepaths
Spider-Man characters